Frontier Outlaws is a 1944 American Western film directed by Sam Newfield shot at the Corriganville Movie Ranch. It was the second film in Producers Releasing Corporation's Billy the Kid film series where Crabbe changed his name to "Billy Carson".

Plot
A gang of cattle rustlers and claim jumpers are terrorising the town of Wolf Valley and hire a fast gun to get rid of Billy Carson by running him out of town.  To the villain's surprise Billy comes to a saloon frequented by the villains and runs the frightened gunslinger out of town.  When the gunslinger tries to shoot Billy in the back with a concealed derringer Billy finishes him off. Though Judge James Ryan is well aware of the true situation he sentences Billy to a jail sentence of 30 days but secretly lets Billy loose to finish off the villains.  Billy disguises himself as a Mexican Charro interested in buying Barlow's rustled cattle in order to gain information to bring the outlaws to justice.

Meanwhile, the outlaws threaten the feisty owner of the Circle C Ranch Ma Clark, but Ma is not the type to be pushed around; and she has her sights set on marrying Judge Ryan.

Cast 
Buster Crabbe as Billy Carson
Al St. John as Fuzzy Q. Jones
Frances Gladwin as Pat Clark
Charles King as Barlow
Marin Sais as Ma Clark
Emmett Lynn as Judge James Ryan
Kermit Maynard as Henchman Wallace
Ed Cassidy as the Sheriff
Jack Ingram as Henchman Taylor
Budd Buster as Bartender

Soundtrack 
Tex Williams and the Big Slicker Band - "Don't Waste No Worry Over Me"
"Home on the Range" - Music by Daniel E. Kelley

See also
The "Billy the Kid" films starring Buster Crabbe: 
 Billy the Kid Wanted (1941)
 Billy the Kid's Round-Up (1941)
 Billy the Kid Trapped (1942)
 Billy the Kid's Smoking Guns (1942)
 Law and Order (1942) 
 Sheriff of Sage Valley (1942) 
 The Mysterious Rider (1942)
 The Kid Rides Again (1943)
 Fugitive of the Plains (1943)
 Western Cyclone (1943)
 Cattle Stampede (1943)
 The Renegade (1943)
 Blazing Frontier (1943)
 Devil Riders (1943)
 Frontier Outlaws (1944)
 Valley of Vengeance (1944)
 The Drifter (1944) 
 Fuzzy Settles Down (1944)
 Rustlers' Hideout (1944)
 Wild Horse Phantom (1944)
 Oath of Vengeance (1944)
 His Brother's Ghost (1945) 
 Thundering Gunslingers (1945)
 Shadows of Death (1945)
 Gangster's Den (1945)
 Stagecoach Outlaws (1945)
 Border Badmen (1945)
 Fighting Bill Carson (1945)
 Prairie Rustlers (1945) 
 Lightning Raiders (1945)
 Terrors on Horseback (1946)
 Gentlemen with Guns (1946)
 Ghost of Hidden Valley (1946)
 Prairie Badmen (1946)
 Overland Riders (1946)
 Outlaws of the Plains (1946)

References

External links 

1944 films
1944 Western (genre) films
American black-and-white films
Billy the Kid (film series)
Producers Releasing Corporation films
American Western (genre) films
1940s English-language films
Films directed by Sam Newfield
1940s American films